The President of the Tasmanian Legislative Council is the presiding officer of the Council.

Presidents of the Legislative Council

External links
 Presidents of the Legislative Council (Parliament of Tasmania)

Lists of presidents of state upper houses in Australia
 
Tasmania-related lists